Henry Green was a road gambler and poker player from Alabama.  He was inducted into the Poker Hall of Fame in 1986.

Notes

Green, Henry
Year of birth missing
Year of death missing
Poker Hall of Fame inductees